Euxoa brevipennis is a moth of the family Noctuidae first described by Smith in 1888. In Canada, it is found in British Columbia, Alberta and Saskatchewan. In the United States, it has been recorded from Utah, Colorado and California.

The wingspan of the moth is about 33 mm.

References

Euxoa
Moths of North America
Moths described in 1888